David Jose Hernandez (born May 13, 1985) is an American former professional baseball relief pitcher. He played in  Major League Baseball (MLB) for the Baltimore Orioles, Philadelphia Phillies, Atlanta Braves, Los Angeles Angels, Arizona Diamondbacks, and Cincinnati Reds. He attended Cosumnes River College.

Professional career

Baltimore Orioles
Hernandez, who is of Mexican-American descent, was drafted by the Baltimore Orioles in the 16th round (483rd overall pick) of the 2005 MLB draft. Hernandez made his MLB debut against the Detroit Tigers on May 28, 2009. He went 5 innings. He gave up five hits, allowed four walks, and one earned run while striking out three. He'd remain in the Baltimore rotation for the remainder of the season, starting 19 games and finishing with a record of 4-10 with a 5.42 ERA. In  innings, he struck out 68. The following season he split time between the rotation and the bullpen for the O's, finishing 8-8 in 41 games, 8 of them starts. In  innings, he struck out 72.

Arizona Diamondbacks

On December 6, 2010, he was traded to the Arizona Diamondbacks (along with Kam Mickolio) for Mark Reynolds and a player to be named later (John Hester). In his first season in Arizona, Hernandez served as a closer for a time in the season, recording 11 saves. In a career high 74 games, he had 77 strikeouts in  innings. He excelled the following season, posting an ERA of 2.50 with 98 strikeouts in  innings. In 2013, he had a high ERA (4.48) despite posting 66 strikeouts in  innings.

Hernandez missed the 2014 season after undergoing Tommy John surgery.

He came back in 2015, posting an ERA of 4.28 in 40 games.

Philadelphia Phillies
On December 9, 2015, Hernandez signed with the Philadelphia Phillies. In his season with Philadelphia, he appeared in 70 games and posted a 3.84 ERA in  innings.

San Francisco Giants
On February 14, 2017, Hernandez signed a minor league contract with the San Francisco Giants.

Atlanta Braves
On March 26, 2017, the Atlanta Braves signed Hernandez to a minor league contract.

Los Angeles Angels
On April 24, 2017, the Braves traded Hernandez to the Los Angeles Angels in exchange for a player to be named later or cash considerations. He appeared in 38 games for the Angels and pitched 36.1 innings, had 37 strikeouts, and finished with a 2.23 ERA before being traded to the Diamondbacks on July 31.

Return to Arizona
On July 31, 2017, Hernandez was traded to the Diamondbacks for Luis Madero. He was 2-1 with a 4.82 ERA.

Cincinnati Reds
On January 30, 2018, Hernandez signed a two-year contract with the Cincinnati Reds. In his first season in Cincinnati, Hernandez appeared in 57 games, registering an ERA of 2.53 in 64 innings. The following season did not go so well for Hernandez as he struggled throughout the season before being designated for assignment on August 10, 2019. He was 2-5 with an ERA of 8.02 in 47 games. On August 10, 2019, the Reds released Hernandez.

New York Yankees
On August 15, 2019, Hernandez signed a minor league deal with the New York Yankees. He was released on September 4, 2019.

Washington Nationals
On January 3, 2020, Hernandez signed a minor league deal the Washington Nationals. He was released by the organization on March 14, 2020.

Cleveland Indians
On July 3, 2020, Hernandez signed a minor league contract with the Cleveland Indians. Hernandez did not play in a game in 2020 due to the cancellation of the minor league season because of the COVID-19 pandemic. He was released by the Indians on September 20, 2020.

International career
Hernandez attempted to join Team Mexico in the 2013 World Baseball Classic, but was not able to put together the proper documentation in time. After an injury to Chris Perez, Hernandez was asked to join Team USA.

Scouting Report
Hernandez throws a 95 mph fastball, a 78 mph slider, and an 84 mph changeup. He is known for his high strikeout rate, which improved at every level in the minors, from 9.54 K/9 in A to 12.46 K/9 in AAA. In the minor leagues he was a flyball pitcher – 45% of balls in play were flyballs, with only 38% of them staying on the ground.

References

External links

David Hernandez at SABR (Baseball BioProject)

1985 births
Living people
Aberdeen IronBirds players
American baseball players of Mexican descent
Arizona Diamondbacks players
Baltimore Orioles players
Baseball players from Sacramento, California
Bowie Baysox players
Cincinnati Reds players
Cosumnes River Hawks baseball players
Delmarva Shorebirds players
Frederick Keys players
Gwinnett Braves players
Los Angeles Angels players
Louisville Bats players
Major League Baseball pitchers
Mobile BayBears players
Norfolk Tides players
Philadelphia Phillies players
Reno Aces players
Scranton/Wilkes-Barre RailRiders players
Visalia Rawhide players
World Baseball Classic players of the United States